The Bridger Mountains may refer to either of two mountain ranges in the United States:

 Bridger Range (Montana)
 Bridger Mountains (Wyoming)

See also
 Bridger Mountain, West Virginia